Sikhya Entertainment is a film production and distribution company that was established by Guneet Monga and Achin Jain.

They have released the films Dasvidaniya (2008), That Girl in Yellow Boots (2011), The Lunchbox (2013) and Masaan.

They have collaborated with some of the filmmakers from different parts of the world including Oscar-winning Bosnian director Danis Tanovic (Tigers), French director Nicolas Saada (Taj Mahal) and British filmmaker Michael Winterbottom (Trishna), to name a few.

In 2016, Sikhya Entertainment ventured into its first English Language film, The Ashram, starring Academy Award-winning actress Melissa Leo and Kal Penn, Norwegian-German film, What Will People Say, directed by Iram Haq which premiered at Toronto Film Festival 2017 amongst others.

The range of Production Services offered by Sikhya includes- Research, Creative collaborations with local Writers, Location Scouting, Budgeting, Casting, Permits, Travel & Accommodation, Hiring of Crew, extensive Post Production services and transparent accounting practices including Third party audit system.

In 2020, they released one of a kind short-film anthology, Zindagi In Short, in collaboration with India's leading e-commerce giant Flipkart. The anthology opened to a thunderous response from both critics and audiences. In addition, Sikhya has successfully ventured into the Southern Film Industry with the blockbuster film on the life of Captain Gopinath, founder of Air Deccan, Soorarai Pottru.

Filmography

References 

Film production companies based in Mumbai
Indian companies established in 2008
Hindi cinema
Mass media companies established in 2008